Yabo is a Local Government Area in Sokoto State, Nigeria. Its headquarters is in the town of Yabo,  and Yabo local Government is one of the oldest local governments in Sokoto.
Since Sokoto, Kebbi and Zamfara are known as Sokoto. by then Yabo, Tambuwal and Shagari are all known as Yabo local government.

The postal code of the area is 851.

History
The people of Yabo under the leadership of their king and scholar, Muhammadu Moyijo played a pivotal role towards Islamic teaching, reformation and establishment of Sokoto Caliphate led by Sheik Uthman Bn Fodiyo. Moyijo was a close friend, companion and supporter of Sheik Uthman Bn Fodio. He accompanied Sheik in several of his Islamic outings and spread his teaching around his localities. On his way to Zamfara, Shehu met Moyijo at a village called Magali where they discussed important issues related to Islam and calling people towards Islam. Their meeting point is historically marked and even today the acclaimed Sheik Fodiyo's well and a tree under which Sheik Fodiyo teaches his followers still exist in Magabcci. In view of his vast knowledge in both Islamic teachings, administration and defence, Moyijo was appointed as the leader as well as the Flag bearer in-charge of Kebbi.

References

Local Government Areas in Sokoto State